The 1945–46 season was Chelsea Football Club's thirty-second competitive season. It saw the first competitive football in England since the end of the Second World War, the FA Cup; Chelsea reached the fifth round. The  Football League did not resume until the following season, so Chelsea continued to play in the regional Football League South; Chelsea finished 10th in the 22-team league. In November, the club also played a high-profile friendly match against FC Dynamo Moscow of the Soviet Union.

References

External links
 1945–46 season at stamford-bridge.com

1945–46
English football clubs 1945–46 season